Monticello Municipal Airport , also known as Ellis Field, is a public-use airport located two nautical miles (4 km) east of the central business district of Monticello, in Drew County, Arkansas, United States. It is owned by the City of Monticello.

This airport is included in the FAA's National Plan of Integrated Airport Systems for 2011–2015, which categorized it as a general aviation airport.

Although most U.S. airports use the same three-letter location identifier for the FAA and IATA, Monticello Municipal Airport is assigned LLQ by the FAA but has no designation from the IATA.

Facilities and aircraft 
The airport covers an area of 385 acres (156 ha) at an elevation of 270 feet (82 m) above mean sea level. It has one runway designated 3/21 with an asphalt surface measuring 5,018 by 75 feet (1,529 x 23 m).

For the 12-month period ending September 30, 2010, the airport had 13,800 aircraft operations, an average of 37 per day: 96% general aviation and 4% military. At that time there were 24 aircraft based at this airport: 87.5% single-engine and 12.5% multi-engine.

References

External links 
 Monticello Municipal Airport (LLQ) at Arkansas Department of Aeronautics
 Aerial image as of 25 January 2002 from USGS The National Map
 

Airports in Arkansas
Transportation in Drew County, Arkansas
Buildings and structures in Drew County, Arkansas